Mantey is an unincorporated community in Linn County, Kansas, United States.

History
The post office in Mantey closed in 1905.

References

Further reading

External links
 Linn County maps: Current, Historic, KDOT

Unincorporated communities in Linn County, Kansas
Unincorporated communities in Kansas